Burford School is a mixed secondary school with academy status located in Burford, Oxfordshire, England. It is one of 40 state boarding schools in England. The school was founded by the Burford Corporation as a grammar school in 1571 and moved to its current premises on Cheltenham Road in 1957. The original building on Lawrence Lane is now used as a boarding house.

The School
The school accepts pupils from partnership schools in a catchment area including Bampton, Brize Norton, Burford, Clanfield, Leafield, Langford, Minster Lovell, Alvescot and the Wychwoods. The school will also support parents right to a 'first choice' school from as far afield as Witney, Lechlade, Bledington and Hook Norton.

In 2012, Burford School was granted Academy Status and in 2015 the school was placed in the top 90 Secondary Schools in England.

The Boarding House is situated at the end of Lawrence Lane – a no-through lane leading to the church at the bottom of the High Street. The entrance is at the end of the lane – OX18 4RP. The boarding house, Lenthall House accepts international students.

School houses
 Falkland House - Yellow: Named after the Earl of Falkland who lived in Great Tew.  He was a benefactor of Burford School and gave his name to Falkland Hall located in the town.
 Heylin House - Blue: Named after an early student and scholar of Burford School.  He lived, for a time, in Minster Lovell and is buried in Westminster Abbey.
 Warwick House - Red: Named after the Earl of Warwick who was a key benefactor of the school.  He contributed money towards the building of alms houses and Warwick Hall located within the town.
 Wysdom House - Green:  Named after Simon Wysdom, a Burford merchant who is credited with being the key founder of Burford School in 1571.

GCSE choices
In Year 9 students choose the subjects they will take for their GCSE Exams in Year 10 and 11. Science, Maths, and English. Students will have options of other subjects, for example; German, Spanish, Religious Education, Geography, History, D&T, Art, Food & Nutrition, Music, Drama, Computer Science.

Uganda link
The school has a link with Bishop Dunstan School in Kalangala, Ssese Island Uganda. Each two-year cycle a group of 14 students visit Uganda and then 14 exchange students return. The fundraising has achieved the construction of a boarding house,  library and computer suite in Uganda, as well as the training of a School Nurse.

Celebrating 450 Years 
In 2022, Burford School celebrated 450 years since its founding. Burford School welcomed some famous guests, the Duke of Gloucester and David Cameron, who were invited to attend 'Charter Day' celebrations. The Headteacher, Matthew Albrighton, described it as an 'honour' to lead the school into this new chapter. More informally, it was celebrated by the production and sale of 450 tote bags, a new window, banners hung, and a half day.

References

Secondary schools in Oxfordshire
1571 establishments in England
Educational institutions established in the 1570s
Academies in Oxfordshire
Boarding schools in Oxfordshire
Burford